Ajintha may refer to:

 Ajintha (film), a 2012 Marathi film
 Ajintha caves, also known as Ajanta Caves near Aurangabad